Highhays is a townland and the location of a 14th-century Medieval pottery site. It was discovered during in 2006 during excavations led by the late Emma Devine and Cóilín Ó Drisceoil. The excavations revealed a previously unknown suburb of Kilkenny which seemed to be the location of an industrial site dedicated to pottery. Amongst the 9,000 finds were a firing kiln, sherds of pottery, a ring-brooch, an ear scoop and decorated buckles. The type of pottery produced there has since been attributed the name Highhays Ware. It is found throughout Kilkenny city as well as other towns and castle sites in the Southeast of Ireland along the River Nore and River Barrow.

The 2022 publication "Highhays, Kilkenny: A Medieval Pottery Production Centre in South-East Ireland" describes the excavation and finds in much detail.

Gallery

Further information 
 Highhays, Kilkenny: A Medieval Pottery Production Centre in South-East Ireland, Oxbow Press, 2022. ISBN 9781789258530.
 Cóilín Ó Drisceoil: Highhays, Kilkenny - A Fourteenth Century Pottery-Making Site (lecture on YouTube)

References 

Townlands of County Kilkenny
Archaeological sites in Ireland